Samuel Lam is a Dallas-based facial plastic surgeon with an expertise in hair and skin treatment, and an author of scientific papers and textbooks. In 2000, he was awarded the Nasal Knowledge Competition gold medal and was the 2002 recipient of the John Orlando Roe Research Award for his work on skin rejuvenation. In January/February 2009, he was honored as the “Surgeon of the Month” in the International Forum by the International Society of Hair Restoration Surgery. He is triple board certified by the American Board of Facial Plastic and Reconstructive Surgery, the American Board of Otolaryngology, serving the specialty of head and neck surgery, and the American Board of Hair Restoration Surgery.

References 

Living people
American plastic surgeons
Year of birth missing (living people)